Hoti is an extinct language of Seram, Indonesia.

External links

Central Maluku languages
Languages of Indonesia
Seram Island
Extinct languages of Asia
Languages extinct in the 2000s